Elections are held periodically in the US state of Mississippi.

US presidential elections are held every 4 years, most recently in 2020. Elections to the House of Representatives are every 2 years, most recently in 2020. Gubernatorial elections are held every 4 years, most recently in 2019, together with general elections for all members of the state legislature. The two US senate seats are elected for overlapping 6 year terms. The Class 1 senate seat was most recently contested in 2018, the Class 2 senate seat was contested in 2020. 

In a 2020 study, Mississippi was ranked as the 4th hardest state for citizens to vote in.

Elections since 2000

2000 
United States presidential election
United States Senate election
United States House of Representatives elections

2002 

 United States Senate election
United States House of Representatives elections

2003 
 General election
 Gubernatorial election

2004 
 United States presidential election
United States House of Representatives elections

2006 
 United States House of Representatives elections
 United States Senate election

2007 
 Primary election
 General election
 Gubernatorial election

2008 
 United States presidential election
 Democratic primary 
 Republican primary
 1st congressional district special election
 United States House of Representatives elections
 United States Senate election
 United States Senate special election

2010 

 United States House of Representatives elections

2011 

 Gubernatorial election

2012 
 United States presidential election
 United States Senate election
United States House of Representatives elections

2014 
 United States House of Representatives elections
 United States Senate election

2015 
 1st congressional district special election
Gubernatorial election

2016 
 United States presidential election
 United States House of Representatives elections

2018
 United States Senate election
 United States Senate special election
United States House of Representatives elections

2019
 Gubernatorial election

2020 
United States presidential election
United States Senate election
Democratic primary
United States House of Representatives elections

2022
United States House of Representatives elections

See also 
Political party strength in Mississippi
United States presidential elections in Mississippi

References

External links
Elections at the Mississippi Secretary of State official website 

 
 
  (State affiliate of the U.S. League of Women Voters)
 

 
Government of Mississippi
Political events in Mississippi